Cleopatra is a 2013 Indian Malayalam-language film directed by Rajan Sankaradi, starring Manoj K. Jayan, Vineeth, Sudha Chandran, and veteran Shankar.  Its release was on hold for over 2 years and finally released on 25 October with poor reviews.

Plot

Cleopatra is an emotional family film which concentrates on family bondings.

Cast

 Manoj K Jayan
 Vineeth
 Sudha Chandran
 Shankar
 Urmila Unni
 Aswathy
 Prerna
 Sudheesh
 Santhakumari

References

2010s Malayalam-language films
Films directed by Rajan Sankaradi